Yitzhak Laor (born in 1948) is an Israeli poet, author and journalist.

Biography
Yitzhak Laor was born in Pardes Hanna.

Literary and journalism career
He is the author of ten volumes of poetry, three novels, three collections of short stories, two collections of essays and one play.

In his poem "In a Village whose Name I don't even know" he imagines himself stranded in a Lebanese village: "For a moment I hoped that I would be caught". His book The Myths of Liberal Zionism was published in English by Verso Books in February 2009.

In a June 2011 article in Haaretz, Laor stated that he opposes Zionism: He claimed that "liberation from Zionism is not a dirty word... we have to get rid of Zionism".

See also
Israeli journalism
Israeli literature

References

External links
An ordered collection of Laor's articles, referenced by Palestine: Information With Provenance
Lines Of Occupation: The Post-Zionist Poetics Of Yitzhak Laor by Joshua Cohen

1948 births
Living people
Israeli poets
Israeli male dramatists and playwrights
Israeli conscientious objectors
Israeli literary critics
Haaretz people
People from Pardes Hanna-Karkur